Storybook World is an animated anthology series released on VHS. The show was produced by A.J Shalleck under Fox Lorber and distributed by Kids Klassics. Each episode is an animated retelling of classic children's stories narrated by Fred Newman. 

Cartoons that were made include "Goldilocks And The Three Bears", "Jack And The Beanstalk", and other familiar stories.
There were other cartoons that was added, such as "The Baseball Bat", and "Teddy On Time". and "The Mystery Of The Missing Fuzzy".

Most of the animation was a form of stop motion using the books original illustrations as templates. Occasionally cel animation was added, such as raindrops and the characters walking. 

Several cartoons were released with the series that were previously aired on TV that were episodes of Famous Classic Tales, After School Specials, and other similar series, released by Kids Klassics.

The original books were published by Troll Associates.

Production 

 Written by: Michael J. Pellowski, Ski Michaels
 Illustrated by: Ed Parker, Len Epstein, George Guzzi
 Animation: Bill Foch, Willy Hartland, Luke Yeager
 Music by: Andy Belling
 Storyteller: Fred Newman
 Created, Produced, and Directed by : A.J. Shalleck

Copyright 1988 Troll Associates.
Distributed by: Fox/Lorber

American children's animated anthology television series